The Indonesia Just Energy Transition Partnership is a 20 billion dollar agreement to decarbonise Indonesia's coal-powered economy, launched on 15 November 2022 at the G20 summit. It comes after the first such agreement, the South Africa JET-IP was announced in 2021 as a partnership with Germany, France, the UK and US. The agreement with Indonesia involves all G7 countries as partners, including Canada, Italy and Japan. It also includes Denmark and Norway. The JETP aims to develop a comprehensive investment plan (the JETP Investment and Policy Plan) to achieve Indonesia's decarbonisation goals.

Under the JETP, Indonesia aims to reach net-zero emissions of greenhouse gases from electricity production by 2050, bringing forward its target by a decade, and reach a peak in those emissions by 2030. According to two think tanks, the $20bn allocated under the programme are insufficient for these goals.

References

Scholz cabinet
Second Macron presidency
COP27
2022 G20 Bali summit